Kolonia is a town in Micronesia.

Kolonia may also refer to the following places:
Kolonia, Chełm County in Lublin Voivodeship (east Poland)
Kolonia, Podlaskie Voivodeship (north-east Poland)
Kolonia, Tomaszów Lubelski County in Lublin Voivodeship (east Poland)
Kolonia, Silesian Voivodeship (south Poland)
Kolonia, Pomeranian Voivodeship (north Poland)
Kolonia, Braniewo County in Warmian-Masurian Voivodeship (north Poland)
Kolonia, Szczytno County in Warmian-Masurian Voivodeship (north Poland)
Kolonia, formerly, a Palestinian Arab village, now called Motza
Kolonia, Polish name for German city Cologne, North Rhine-Westphalia